The .297/230 Morris Short and .297/230 Morris Long are two obsolete centerfire firearm cartridges developed as sub-caliber training rounds for the British Martini–Henry rifle.

Design
The .297/230 Morris Short and .297/230 Morris Long are both rimmed bottlenecked centrefire miniature rifle and pistol cartridges.

.297/230 Morris Short

.297/230 Morris Long

History
The .297/230 Morris cartridges were produced for use in the Morris Aiming Tube, a commercial sub-calibre barrel inserted into the barrel of a large bore rifle or pistol for training or short range target practice. The Morris Aiming Tube worked well enough for it to be adopted for service in August 1883 by both the British Army and the Royal Navy for use in the Martini-Henry rifle.

The Morris Aiming Tube was later adapted for use in the .303 British Martini-Metford rifle, the Lee–Metford rifle in 1891 and the Webley Revolver, with both the .297/230 Morris Short and the .297/230 Morris Long being fired through the tubes. In the Lee-Metford rifle, the Morris Tube and the .297/230 cartridge were not particularly accurate and were replaced after 1908 by a new  tube firing the rimfire .22 Long Rifle cartridge which was more accurate, quieter and much cheaper.

Birmingham Small Arms Company produced Martini actioned rook rifles chambered in these cartridges, and some European single shot pistols and rifles were also chambered in them.  The cartridges were still manufactured by Eley Brothers and Kynoch as late as 1962.

See also
 List of rifle cartridges
 5 mm rifle cartridges
 Rook rifle

References

External links
  The Morris Aiming Tubes
 Ammo-One, ".297/230 Morris Short", ammo-one.com, retrieved 4 April 2018.
 Cartridgecollector, "297/230 Morris Long", cartridgecollector.net, retrieved 4 April 2018.
 Cartridgecollector, "297/230 Morris Short", cartridgecollector.net, retrieved 4 April 2018.
 The Spanish Association of Cartridge Collectors, ".297-.230 Morris Long", municion.org , retrieved 4 April 2018.
 The Spanish Association of Cartridge Collectors, ".297-.230 Morris Short Mk I", municion.org , retrieved 4 April 2018.

Pistol and rifle cartridges
British firearm cartridges
Military cartridges
Rook rifle cartridges